Vectorial synthesis is synthesis of exported proteins by ribosomes in which the ribosome-nascent chain complex is bound directly to the endoplasmic reticulum (ER) and the nascent peptide chain moves through the ER membrane as it emerges from the ribosome.

References

Further reading
Fuller-Pace, F., Peters, G., Dickson, C. Cell transformation by kFGF requires secretion but not glycosylation, Journal of Cell Biology (1991) 115 (2), pp. 547–555

Protein folding
Protein biosynthesis